Yang County, or Yangxian, is a county in Hanzhong, Shaanxi Province, China. Yang County lies within the Shaanan region, on the easternmost portion of the Hanzhong Basin, bordered by the Daba Mountains to the south, and the Qin Mountains to the north.

History

The area of present-day Yang County has been inhabited for approximately 7,000 years, since the Neolithic period. The area belonged to the Liang dynasty.

Prior to being annexed into the Jin dynasty, the area was organized as Chenggu County. During the Jin dynasty, the area was organized as Xingdao County and Huangjin County.

Upon the establishment of the Tang dynasty in 758CE, it became the seat of Yang Prefecture.

In 1370, under the Ming dynasty, the area was re-organized as Yang County.

In 1913, under Republican China, the area was placed under . In 1928, Hanzhong Circuit was abolished and the area was governed directly by Shaanxi Province officials.

Beginning in August 1931, groups loyal to the Chinese Communist Party began organizing in the area. On December 4, 1949, these groups coordinated with the People's Liberation Army to take control of the area. On December 14, the Yang County People's Government was established to formally govern the area. Between the county's re-establishment in December 1949 and September 1961, it was re-organized eight times. Since then, Yang County has not been re-organized, and has remained under the jurisdiction of Hanzhong.

A number of major historical figures in Chinese history, including Du Fu, Bai Juyi, Su Shi, and Wen Tong, have visited present-day Yang County.

Administrative divisions 
Yang County is divided into 3 subdistricts and 15 towns. These township-level divisions are then further divided into 16 residential communities and 271 administrative villages.

The county's 3 subdistricts are:

 Yangzhou Subdistrict
 
 

The county's 15 towns are:
 
 
 
 
 
 
 
 
 
 
 
Maoping




Geography

Yang County is located in southwestern Shaanxi Province, near Chenggu County and Xixiang County, and is part of the Shannan region. It sits in the eastern Hanzhong Basin, on the Han River. The Daba Mountains are to the south of the county; to the north are the Qin Mountains. The northern part of the county generally has a higher elevation, while the southern part is generally lower in elevation.

Climate 
The county experiences an average of 1752.2 hours of sunshine, and 239 frost-free days annually.

Economy 
Yang County has a sizable agricultural sector, which grows 469 different types of ingredients for traditional Chinese medicine, such as Magnolia officinalis, jujube, and Scutellaria baicalensis. Other distinct agricultural products to the county include its distinct black rice, and its distinct red rice.

The county also has a number of mineral deposits.

Yang County has a number of tourist sites, including the AAAA-rated Huayang Scenic Area, and the AAA-rated Tomb of Cai Lun.

Transport

Yang County is served by Hanzhong Airport and the Yangpingguan–Ankang Railway. Its major roads are the G5 Beijing–Kunming Expressway, part of the National Expressway System; China National Highway 108; and Provincial Road 230.

The Xi'an–Chengdu High-Speed Railway, currently under construction, is scheduled to begin operations in December 2017.

Education

Notes and references

Relative location

 
County-level divisions of Shaanxi
Hanzhong